Qorbanlu (also Romanized as Qorbānlū) is a village in Angut-e Sharqi Rural District, Anguti District, Germi County, Ardabil Province, Iran. At the 2006 census, its population was 77, in 13 families.

References 

Towns and villages in Germi County